Arne Schönbohm (born 28 July 1969) is the former president of the German Federal Office for Information Security.

Biography
Schönbohm was born in Hamburg. He studied international business administration at the International School of Management in Dortmund, as well as in London and Taipei.

From 1995 until 2008 Schönbohm worked at EADS Germany in several senior positions, including as Vice President Commercial and Defense Solutions for EADS Secure Networks.

In 2008, he set up his own consulting business.

He was the chair of Cyber Security Council of Germany e.V., an association that later came under criticism for ties to Russian secret services.

Appointed by Minister of the Interior Thomas de Maizière, Schönbohm became president of the German Federal Office for Information Security in 2016. In October 2022, following a report by ZDF television, his connections to Russian secret services came under scrutiny again. He was released from his post shortly afterwards.

Other activities
 Deutschland sicher im Netz (DSIN), Member of the Advisory Board
 Foundation for Data Protection, Member of the Advisory Board
 Atlantik-Brücke, Member

References

External links
 

1969 births
Living people
People from Hamburg
People associated with computer security
21st-century German civil servants